Bruno Petrachi (born 20 January 1997) is an Italian football goalkeeper playing at A.C. Monza Brianza 1912.

References

1997 births
Living people
Italian footballers
A.C. Monza players
U.S. Lecce players
Serie D players
Association football goalkeepers